Wangsa Maju is a township and a constituency in Kuala Lumpur, Malaysia.

Wangsa Maju may also refer to:

Wangsa Maju (federal constituency), represented in the Dewan Rakyat
Wangsa Maju LRT station